Hans-Jörg Uther (born 20 July 1944 in Herzberg am Harz) is a German literary scholar and folklorist.

Biography
Uther studied Folklore, Germanistik and History between 1969 and 1970 at the University of Munich and between 1970 and 1973 at the University of Göttingen. In his last academic year, he passed the first state examination for teaching at grammar schools. In 1971, he began a period of over 40 years working on the Enzyklopädie des Märchens, initially as a student assistant, from 1973 as an editor. In 1980 he became a PhD with the Dissertation "Behinderte in populären Erzählungen" ("The Disabled in Folktales") in Göttingen.

From 1990 to 1992 he was a lecturer at the University of Göttingen, and from 1991 to 1994 at the University-Gesamthochschule Essen. In 1994 he gained his Habilitation there in German studies, literature and folklore. From 2000 he was professor extraordinarius for German and literature studies in Essen. Since 2010, Uther has been the head of the Enzyklopädie des Märchens until the end of the project at the end of 2015.

Uther published on comparative and historical folklore, on children's and youth literature, on folkloristic art history as well as on research into tale-types, their content, and motifs. In the years 1989 to 2002 he was editor of the series Die Märchen der Weltliteratur of Eugen Diederichs Verlag. Since 1988 he has been co-editor of the journal Fabula. He also published two important editions of Grimm's Fairy Tales in 1996 and 2004. In 2004, his revision of the Aarne-Thompson Index appeared. 138 of the approximately 4,000 articles in the Enzyklopädie des Märchens were written by Uther.

Uther has been a corresponding member of the Akademie für Kinder- und Jugendliteratur (Academy for Children's and Youth Literature) in Volkach since 1992 and, since 1993, "Folklore Fellow" of the Finnish Academy of Sciences in Helsinki. He also belongs to the scientific advisory board of the Brüder Grimm-Gesellschaft in Kassel.

Major works

Biographies

 Kürschners Deutscher Gelehrten-Kalender 2005. Band III, Schi-Z. München 2005.

References

Ludwig Maximilian University of Munich alumni
University of Göttingen alumni
Academic staff of the University of Göttingen
1944 births
Living people